Alter Ego is a 2017 Nigerian drama film written by Jude Martins, directed by Moses Inwang and screenwriting by Esther Eyibio and produced by Sidomex Universal. It stars Omotola Jalade, Wale Ojo, Jide Kosoko and Kunle Remi.

Plot
Alter Ego tells a story of a successful lawyer who has dedicated a great part of her professional life to prosecuting sex offenders. She adopts any measure possible to see that sex offenders, especially those who molest children, are jailed. Ada Igwe (Omotola Jalade) does not only rely on the law to exert punitive measures on offenders as she also uses unorthodox methods to make sure those she finds guilty of child molestation and sex offences pay for their crimes.
Her quest for justice is influenced by her personal childhood experience as she was raped by her teacher in school. However, her drive to punish sex offenders is impeded by her high craves for sex. A situation that is beyond her control. She engages her domestic as well as official workers in sex to quench her urge whenever she feels the cravings, irrespective of the time and place.

Cast
 Omotola Jalade Ekeinde as Adaora Igwe
 Wale Ojo
 Esther Eyibio
 Kunle Remi
 Emem Inwang
 Jide Kosoko

Production
Wale Ojo revealed that all the sex scenes he played with Omotola Jalade Ekeinde were real: "Our kisses were real. We grabbed each other, we were passionate, it is natural. It is real." Omotola confirmed she had to go the extra mile on the set: "There are several ways to shoot a sex scene tastefully. I'm all for playing a sex scene convincingly and my husband knows this."

Reception
The film was released to a mixed reception. Vanguard News comments: "Omotola has proved once again that she is still in the game with a strong and convincing performance as Adaora Igwe. She inhabits the characters of both barrister and sex addict, switching seamlessly between both. You are literarily sucked into her world and even with her flaws, you find yourself still rooting for her success. Despite the weight gain, she still exudes her trademark sexiness for which her fans have come to love her for."

Review Naija writes: "My major drawback with this movie is that the characters were not fully developed. The beginning felt rushed, so we got to see a lot of Ada but not much of any other character. Even at that, I think Ada’s character could have been developed further. When the movie ended, I was intrigued (as I’m sure you will be when you watch the movie) but not vested enough in any of the characters to care how they ended up."

References 

Films about rape
Films about sex addiction
Nigerian drama films
English-language Nigerian films
2010s English-language films
2017 drama films